Teresa Tairi is a former New Zealand international netball player. She has also coached netball for teams from the Cook Islands and in Australia.

Early life
Teresa Tairi was born in the Cook Islands. She later moved to New Zealand, and attended Auckland Girls Grammar School.

Netball playing career
Tairi first played for the Silver Ferns, the New Zealand national netball team, in 1993, when she won a silver medal at the 1993 World Games. She represented the country on 28 occasions. In 1994 she tore the anterior cruciate ligament in her right knee while playing for the national team, and three years later she tore the same ligament in her left knee. She represented New Zealand in the 1999 World Netball Championships, held in Christchurch, New Zealand, winning a silver medal. In 2000, she experienced further difficulties, tearing her right knee cartilage, but was able to get back into the national team in the same year. Tairi played for the Northern Force club from 1998 to 2005. For the 2008 ANZ Championship, the Force merged with the Auckland Diamonds to create the Northern Mystics and Tairi played with the Mystics in that year.

Coaching
In 2009, Tairi coached the Cook Islands for the Netball World Youth Cup, held in Raratonga in the Cook Islands. The team finished sixth, its best-ever performance. After moving to Australia in 2009, Tairi began to coach both men's and mixed netball teams playing for New South Wales, a role she continued in until 2020. In Australia, she works as a Learning and Development Advisor for the Schindler Group.

References

 

Living people
New Zealand international netball players
New Zealand sportspeople of Cook Island descent
Northern Mystics players
Netball players from Auckland
Date of birth missing (living people)
Year of birth missing (living people)
Northern Force players
Netball players at the 1993 World Games